Walter Howard "Slim" McGrew (August 5, 1899 – August 21, 1967) was a Major League Baseball pitcher who played for the Washington Senators from  to .

External links

1899 births
1967 deaths
Major League Baseball pitchers
Baseball players from Texas